Adolf Dickfeld (20 February 1910 – 17 May 2009) was a German Luftwaffe military aviator during World War II, an ace credited with 136 enemy aircraft shot down in about 1,072 combat missions. He was also a recipient of the Knight's Cross of the Iron Cross with Oak Leaves, the highest award in the military and paramilitary forces of Nazi Germany during World War II.

Early life and career
Dickfeld was born on 20 February 1910 in Jüterbog in the Province of Brandenburg, the son of an artillery officer. In his youth he learned to fly glider aircraft. He made his first flights at the glider school in Grunau in Silesia, present-day Jeżów Sudecki, Poland. Here, among others, he was taught to fly by Hanna Reitsch. He was also trained by Wolf Hirth on the Hornberg in the Black Forest, and by Heini Dittmar and Oskar Ursinus at the Wasserkuppe in the Rhön Mountains.

After attending school and passing his Abitur (School Leaving Certificate), Dickfeld attended the flight school at Frankfurt (Oder) from 3 September to 23 December 1934, receiving his A-license for motor powered aircraft. He then received the B-license at the flight school in Stolp, present-day Słupsk, after completing a course from 2 January to 28 February 1935. On 3 March, he continued his training at the flight school in Hagenow, a course with emphasis on aerobatics which he completed in June 1935.

From 2 July 1935 to 28 February 1937, Dickfeld was based at the Deutsche Verkehrsfliegerschule, a covert military-training organization, under the command of Alfred Keller in Braunschweig. There, he received further training and became an instrument flight instructor. He also trained in the military reserve force of the newly emerging Luftwaffe. Dickfeld studied radio technology before officially joining the Luftwaffe on 1 January 1939, where he served in aerial reconnaissance.

World War II
World War II in Europe had begun on Friday, 1 September 1939, when German forces invaded Poland. Dickfeld was transferred to II. Gruppe (2nd Group)  of Jagdgeschwader 52 (JG 52—52nd Fighter Wing) on 28 October 1939 and was promoted to Leutnant der Reserve (second lieutenant of the reserves) on 1 December 1939. He received the Iron Cross 2nd Class  on 13 December and the Iron Cross 1st Class on 12 January 1940, both during the Phoney War period in protection of Germany's western border.

In 1940, Dickfeld flew missions during the Battle of France and Britain. He was then posted to a Luftwaffe training battalion as a company commander and on 21 February 1941, he was made a war office candidate. He was the posted to the Stab (headquarters unit) of JG 52. On 15 May, III./JG 52 was moved to Athens and together with other Luftwaffe units, flews its first combat missions in support of the Battle of Crete. During this campaign, Dickfeld flew multiple missions against Greek forces and other Allied forces.

Eastern Front
Following its brief deployment in the Balkan Campaign, III. Gruppe was ordered to Bucharest by mid-June. There, the unit was subordinated to the Luftwaffenmission Rumänien (Luftwaffe Mission Romania) and reequipped with the new, more powerful Messerschmitt Bf 109 F-4 model. On 21 June 1941, the Gruppe was ordered to Mizil in preparation of Operation Barbarossa, the German invasion of the Soviet Union. Its primary objective was to provide fighter protection for the oil fields and refineries at Ploiești. The invasion of the Soviet Union began on 22 June. The next day, the Gruppe moved to Mamaia, the northern district of Constanța on the Black Sea coast. There, Dickfeld claimed his first two aerial victories on 26 June. He was credited with shooting down a Soviet Ilyushin DB-3 bomber and a Tupolev SB bomber in the morning.

The Gruppe moved to Belaya Tserkov on 1 August and also used an airfield at Yampil from 6 to 8 August. In August. Dickfeld increased his number of aerial victories to ten, claiming three Soviet fighters on 4 August, one on 11 August, another on 14 August, and two Polikarpov I-16 fighters on 16 August.

On 23 October, III. Gruppe moved from Poltava to Chaplynka. The following day, Dickfeld became an "ace-in-a-day" for the first time when shot down five Soviet Polikarpov I-15 fighter aircraft near Ishun.

On 19 March 1942, Dickefeld together with fellow JG 52 pilot Feldwebel Edmund Roßmann were awarded the Knight's Cross of the Iron Cross. On 29 April, III. Gruppe had relocated to Zürichtal, a small village at the Inhul in the former German settlement west of Feodosia in the Crimea. On 1 May, the Gruppe was subordinated to VIII. Fliegerkorps and was supporting the 11th Army in the Battle of the Kerch Peninsula. There, Dickfeld claimed eleven aerial victories on 8 May making him a "double-ace-in-a-day", taking his total to 73 aerial victories.

According to Obermaier, Dickfeld was credited with his 100th aerial victory on 18 May 1942. He was the 8th Luftwaffe pilot to achieve the century mark. That day, he was awarded the Knight's Cross of the Iron Cross with Oak Leaves. He was the 94th member of the German armed forces to be so honored. The presentation was made by Adolf Hitler at the Wolf's Lair, Hitler's headquarters in Rastenburg on 25 May.

North Africa

In early November 1942, the Western Allies launched Operation Torch, the Anglo–American invasion of French North Africa. On 17 November, II. Gruppe of JG 2 was withdrawn from the English Channel Front and ordered to San Pietro Clarenza, Sicily. At the time, the Gruppe was equipped with the Focke-Wulf Fw 190 A-3, some Fw 190 A-2s, and received the A-4 variant in early December. This made II. Gruppe of JG 2 the only Fw 190 equipped fighter unit in the Mediterranean Theater. The Gruppe flew its first missions on 19 November, securing German air and sea transportation to Tunis. That day, elements of II. Gruppe began relocating to Bizerte Airfield. On 8 January 1943 during an emergency takeoff, Dickfeld crashed his Focke-Wulf Fw 190 A-4 (Werknummer 0750—factory number) by running into a bomb crater. The aircraft summersaulted and Dickfeld was injured.

On 15 April, Dickfeld was appointed Gruppenkommandeur of II. Gruppe of Jagdgeschwader 11 (JG 11—11h Fighter Wing), an office he held until May when he transferred command to Hauptmann Günther Specht. He was transferred to the Reich Air Ministry in December 1943. There, he was appointed Reichs-Inspekteur der Flieger Hitlerjugend (Reich inspector of the Aviation Hitler Youth). He was promoted to Oberstleutnant (lieutenant colonel) on 1 June 1944 and appointed General für Nachwuchs Luftwaffe (general of procreation/recruitment), a position he held until the end of World War II.

Dickfeld was officially credited with 136 victories claimed in 1072 combat missions. He also claimed a further 15 enemy aircraft unconfirmed. He claimed about 128 victories over the Eastern Front. He claimed one victory flying the Heinkel He 162 Salamander ("Volksjäger") jet fighter, a P-47 Thunderbolt on 11 April 1945.

Later life
After the war in 1952, Dickfeld initiated the Association of Knight's Cross Recipients. He then lived in East Africa for many years and founded the safari-airline "Alf Air Safaris" in Dar es Salaam, flying tourists to the various African landmarks and points of interest. Dickfeld, who also published a number of books, died on 17 May 2009 in Dreieich, Germany.

Summary of career

Aerial victory claims
According to Spick, Dickfeld was credited with 136 aerial victories, 115 on the Eastern Front and 18 in North Africa and the Western Front, including 11 four engine bombers. Mathews and Foreman, authors of Luftwaffe Aces — Biographies and Victory Claims, researched the German Federal Archives and found records for 132 aerial victory claims, plus five further unconfirmed claims. This figure of confirmed claims includes 128 aerial victories on the Eastern Front and four Western Front, including two four-engine bombers.

Victory claims were logged to a map-reference (PQ = Planquadrat), for example "PQ 0512". These sectors were then subdivided into 36 smaller units to give a location area 3 × 4 km in size.

Awards
 Iron Cross (1939)
 2nd Class (13 December 1939)
 1st Class (12 January 1940)
 Honour Goblet of the Luftwaffe on 15 December 1941 as Leutnant and pilot
 German Cross in Gold on 22 January 1942 as Leutnant of the Reserves in the 7./Jagdgeschwader 52
 Knight's Cross of the Iron Cross with Oak Leaves
 Knight's Cross on 19 March 1942 as Leutnant (war officer) and pilot in the 7./Jagdgeschwader 52
 94th Oak Leaves on 19 May 1942 as Leutnant (war officer) and pilot in the 7./Jagdgeschwader 52
 Royal Bulgarian Merit medal in Gold

Publications

Notes

References

Citations

Bibliography

 
 
 
 
 
 
 
 
 
 
 
 
 
 
 
 
 
 
 
 
 

1910 births
2009 deaths
People from Jüterbog
Luftwaffe pilots
German World War II flying aces
People from the Province of Brandenburg
Recipients of the Gold German Cross
Recipients of the Knight's Cross of the Iron Cross with Oak Leaves
Hitler Youth members
Military personnel from Brandenburg